Limba people may refer to:

 Limba people (Cameroon)
 Limba people (Sierra Leone)

See also
 Limba (disambiguation)